Stearne Ball Miller  (1813 – 2 May 1897) was an Irish Conservative Party barrister, judge and politician.

He was born in Armagh, son of the Reverend George Miller, the Anglican priest and noted historian, and Elizabeth Ball, daughter of Robert Ball of County Wicklow.He was called to the Bar in 1835, Queen's Counsel in 1852.He married Sarah Rutherford, daughter of M.B. Rutherford of Dublin. He lived at Rutland Square in Dublin.

Miller was first elected MP for Armagh City in 1857, but was defeated at the next election in 1859. He regained the seat at the 1865 election, but resigned after being appointed the judge in bankruptcy in 1867.He held office as the Irish Bankruptcy judge until his death in 1897.

References

External links
 

1813 births
1897 deaths
Irish Conservative Party MPs
Members of the Parliament of the United Kingdom for County Armagh constituencies (1801–1922)
UK MPs 1857–1859
UK MPs 1865–1868
19th-century Irish judges
Irish Queen's Counsel
19th-century King's Counsel